Cabramatta International Nines is a rugby league nines tournament held annually in Cabramatta, New South Wales, Australia it was first held in 2003. The 2020 will be broadcast online by The81stMinute Call Team on steelesports.com.au with video streaming through the Cabramatta Facebook page. This will be the fourth time The81stMinute Call Team has broadcast the Nines.

Clubs and Teams
Some of the Clubs and Teams to compete in the Cabramatta International Nines
Australian Aboriginal rugby league team
Niue national rugby league team
Portugal national rugby league team
Latin Heat Rugby League
Japan national rugby league team
Chile national rugby league team
El Salvador national rugby league team
Balmain Ryde-Eastwood Tigers
Papua New Guinea national rugby league team
Mount Pritchard Mounties
Cabramatta Two Blues
The Entrance Tigers
Western Suburbs Magpies
Kingsgrove Colts
Cook Islands national rugby league team
Vanuatu national rugby league team
Philippines national rugby league team
Canada national rugby league team
Fiji national rugby league team
Greece national rugby league team
East Campbelltown Eagles
Malta national rugby league team
Samoa national rugby league team
Blacktown Workers
Copenhagen RLFC
Jamaica national rugby league team
Thailand national rugby league team
Helensburgh Tigers
La Perouse United
Narellan Jets
Guildford Owls
Asquith Magpies
American Samoa national rugby league team
Banty Roosters

Rules
There are a number of rule variations that are implemented to ensure the games are faster and to ensure fewer delays and stoppages.

The major Rule changes that differ from regular NRL games are:
 Two nine-minute halves with a two-minute half time period.
 Nine players a side with five unlimited interchange players (six interchanges in 2014).
 Scrums are only formed after a double knock on, with attacking teams electing which side to feed the ball.
 No video referee, with one on-field referee, two touch judges and two in-goal judges.
 Five minute golden try period in qualifying rounds with the match deemed a draw if there is no score, while unlimited golden try for the finals.
 A tap restart takes place after a 40/20.
 Five points for a try scored in the bonus zone under the posts, with two point drop kick conversion attempts.
 The scoring team will have a dropkick off to restart play.
 Three minute sin bins (Five in 2014).
 Five tackles in a set.

Results

2008

2009

2010

2011
on the 5 of February The International 9's tournament is played at New Era Stadium, Cabramatta. Plate Grand Final: Macarthur Brothers 28 def Japan 12. Trophy Grand Final: Mounties 22 def Bankstown 10. Cup Grand Final: Balmain Ryde-Eastwood Tigers 6 def Fiji 4.

2012
Indigenous Australia defeated Vanuatu 17-12 in the Trophy Grand Final. And were undefeated throughout the tournament.
Ash Kris of Indigenous Australia was the Top Try Scorer of the tournament with 7 tries in 5 games. Hughie Stanley of the Indigenous Australia was the Top Point Scorer with 34 points, 5 tries and 7 goals.
Former NRL player Yileen Gordon captained the Indigenous Australia.

2013

2014

2015

2016
The 2016 edition of the tournament was cancelled due to severe thunderstorm over the New Era Stadium the venue of the games. 3 games of the round robin round was played before the cancellation.

See also

References

External links
 

Recurring sporting events established in 2003
Rugby league nines
Rugby league competitions in New South Wales
Rugby league in Sydney
International rugby league competitions hosted by Australia
2003 establishments in Australia